Jagdish Awasthi (1923-2008) was an Indian politician.  He was elected to the Lok Sabha, the lower house of the Parliament of India from the Bilhaur constituency of Uttar Pradesh as a member of the Indian National Congress.

References

External links
 Official Biographical Sketch in Lok Sabha Website

1923 births
Indian National Congress politicians
2008 deaths
India MPs 1957–1962
India MPs 1984–1989
Lok Sabha members from Uttar Pradesh